The 2012 Dumfries and Galloway Council election took place on 3 May 2012 to elect members of Dumfries and Galloway Council. The election used the thirteen wards created as a result of the Local Governance (Scotland) Act 2004, with each ward electing three or four councillors using the single transferable vote system form of proportional representation, with 47 councillors being elected.

The election saw Labour replace the Scottish Conservative Party as the largest party on the council as they gained 1 seat while the Tories lost 4 seats. The Scottish National Party retained their third place on the authority but did not gain any additional seats. Independents proved to be the biggest winners as they returned to the council with 7 seats and 5 net gains which included 2 former members of the Labour party. The Scottish Liberal Democrats proved to be the worst performers of the election, being reduced to just a single seat.

Following the election the Conservative Party formed a coalition with the support of the SNP. This replaced the previous Conservative-Lib Dem coalition which existed from 2007 to 2012.

Election result

Note: "Votes" are the first preference votes. The net gain/loss and percentage changes relate to the result of the previous Scottish local elections on 3 May 2007. This may differ from other published sources showing gain/loss relative to seats held at dissolution of Scotland's councils.

Ward results

Stranraer and North Rhins
2007: 1xLab; 1xCon; 1xSNP
2012: 1xIndependent; 1xSNP; 1xLab
2007-2012 Change: Independent gain one seat from Con

Wigtown West
2007: 1xSNP; 1xLab; 1xCon
2012: 1xIndependent; 1xSNP; 1xCon
2007-2012 Change: Independent gain one seat from Lab

Mid Galloway
2007: 1xSNP; 1xCon; 1xLib Dem
2012: 1xSNP; 1xIndependent; 1xCon
2007-2012 Change: Independent gain one seat from Lib Dem

 = Sitting Councillor for a different Ward.

Dee
2007: 1xCon; 1xIndependent; 1xSNP
2012: 2xIndependent; 1xCon
2007-2012 Change: Independent gain one seat from SNP

Castle Douglas and Glenkens
2007: 1xCon; 1xSNP; 1xIndependent
2012: 1xCon; 1xIndependent; 1xSNP
2007-2012 Change: No change

Abbey
2007: 2xCon; 1xSNP; 1xLab
2012: 2xLab; 1xCon; 1xSNP
2007-2012 Change: Lab gain one seat from Con

North West Dumfries
2007: 2xLab; 1xCon; 1xSNP
2012: 2xLab; 1xCon; 1xSNP
2007-2012 Change: No change

Mid and Upper Nithsdale
2007: 2xLab; 1xCon; 1xSNP
2012: 2xLab; 1xCon; 1xSNP
2007-2012 Change: No change

Lochar
2007: 2xCon; 1xLab; 1xSNP
2012: 2xLab; 1xSNP; 1xCon
2007-2012 Change: Lab gain one seat from Con

Nith
2007: 2xLab; 1xSNP; 1xCon
2012: 2xLab; 1xSNP; 1xCon
2007-2012 Change: No change

Annandale South
2007: 2xLab; 1xLib Dem; 1xCon
2012: 2xLab; 1xLib Dem; 1xCon
2007-2012 Change: No change

Annandale North
2007: 2xCon; 1xLab; 1xLib Dem
2012: 2xCon; 1xLab; 1xSNP
2007-2012 Change: SNP gain one seat from Lib Dem

Annandale East and Eskdale
2007: 3xCon; 1xLab
2012: 2xCon; 1xLab; 1xIndependent 
2007-2012 Change: Independent gain one seat from Con

Changes since election
† Annandale North Labour Cllr Ted Brown died on 4 September 2012. Annandale councillor Ted Brown's death shocks council A by-election was held on 15 November 2012 which was won by Graeme Tait of the Scottish Conservative and Unionist Party.
†† On 20 September 2013 6 members of the Conservative Party quit their group and became Independents.Dumfries and Galloway Council resignations hit ruling group
††† Annandale North Conservative Cllr Graeme Tait announced on 20 March 2014 that he has defected to the Labour Party stating that he felt its "policies and values" better reflect his own. Annandale Conservative councillor Graeme Tait joins Labour He resigned his Council seat on 22 September 2016.Dumfries and Galloway councillor Graeme Tait resigns A by-election was held on 17 November 2016 and was won by the Conservative Party's Douglas Fairbairn.
†††† In August 2015 Lochar SNP Cllr resigned from the party and became an Independent citing racial prejudice towards her and having lost out at a candidate selection for the Scottish Parliament election, 2016.SNP under fire for shocking racism and bullying claims by Chinese councillor SNP branches hit back at councillor who quit party over racism claims

By-elections since 2012

References 

2012
2012 Scottish local elections